Oju Chosan (Japanese : オジュウチョウサン, foaled April 3, 2011) is a retired champion Japanese thoroughbred racehorse who is best known for his multiple victories in Japan's major steeplechase races. He owns speed records in Nakayama Racecourse's two annual Grade 1 jump races: the Nakayama Grand Jump, which he has won six times (including five consecutive victories from 2016 to 2020),  and the Nakayama Daishogai, which he has won on three occasions.

Background
Oju Chosan's father is Stay Gold, a winner of 7 races from 50 starts who would later become one of Japan's most influential stallions, siring such flat champions as Orfevre and Gold Ship. Stay Gold's father is American Horse of the Year and Triple Crown contender Sunday Silence.

Oju Chosan's mother is Shadow Silhouette, sired by two-time Japanese Horse of the Year Symboli Kris S.

Racing career
Oju Chosan made his debut at the Tokyo Racecourse under the training of Mitsuhiro Ogata on October 2013 in a flat race but finished in 11th place and his second race in 8th place, before a broken front leg forced him to take a year off, by which point maiden races that suited Oju Chosan had finished. They then tried to have him run in a steeplechase race in November 2014, but came in last. 

Training role was soon passed from Ogata to Shoichirō Wada soon after, with Shinichi Ishigami being his primary jockey. From there, Oju Chosan's performance gradually improved, as he would go on to win 11 steeplechase races in a row from 2016 to 2019, and ultimately win 20 races from 38 starts as of April 2022. In addition to his victories in the Nakayama Grand Jump and Nakayama Daishogai, he has won the Grade 2 Tokyo High Jump at Tokyo Racecourse two times and the Grade 2 Hanshin Spring Jump at Hanshin Racecourse three times.

Oju Chosan's victory at the Nakayama Grand Jump in 2022 made him the oldest horse in Japan to win a graded race, as well as the most wins in a JRA G1 steeplechase races.

Oju Chosan retired in December 2022 after finishing in 6th place at the 2022 Nakayama Daishogai behind Nishino Daisy.

Pedigree

See also
 List of historical horses

References

Racehorses bred in Japan
Racehorses trained in Japan
2011 racehorse births
Steeplechase racehorses